"Take It to the Limit " is a song by German Eurodance group Centory. It was released on 28 October 1994 as the second single from their only album, Alpha Centory (1994), and was a notable hit in Europe. The song peaked within the top 20 in Finland and was a top 30 hit in Austria, France, Germany and Italy. On the Eurochart Hot 100, it reached number 68, while reaching number eight on the European Dance Radio Chart.

Track listing

Credits
Artwork – Shandia
Executive producer – Werner Lindinger
Lyrics – Durron Butler
Music – Alex Trime, Gary Carolla, Sven Jordan
Performers – Alex Trime, Gary Carolla, Sven Jordan, Turbo B.
Producer – Alex Trime & Delgado, Gary Carolla
Rap – Turbo B
Vocals (uncredited) – Lori Glori

Charts

References

1994 singles
1994 songs
Centory songs
Electronic songs
EMI Records singles